Night Court is a 1932 American pre-Code crime film directed by W. S. Van Dyke and written by Bayard Veiller and Lenore Coffee. The film stars Phillips Holmes, Walter Huston, Anita Page, Lewis Stone and Mary Carlisle. The film was released June 4, 1932, by Metro-Goldwyn-Mayer.

Cast 
Phillips Holmes as Mike Thomas
Walter Huston as Judge Moffett
Anita Page as Mary Thomas
Lewis Stone as Judge Osgood
Mary Carlisle as Elizabeth Osgood
John Miljan as Crawford
Jean Hersholt as Janitor
Tully Marshall as Grogan
Noel Francis as Lil Baker

References

External links 
 
 

1932 films
1932 crime films
American crime films
American black-and-white films
American courtroom films
American films based on plays
Films directed by W. S. Van Dyke
Metro-Goldwyn-Mayer films
1930s English-language films
1930s American films